The women's 1500 metres event  at the 1973 European Athletics Indoor Championships was held on 11 March in Rotterdam. There were only three participants.

Results

References

1500 metres at the European Athletics Indoor Championships
1500